CLS may refer to:

Academic fields
 Critical legal studies, school of legal philosophy
 Constrained least square statistical estimator
 CLs method to set bounds on particle physics model parameters
 The .cls file extension, used to hold LaTeX manuscripts - see LaTeX § Compatibility and converters

Education
California Labor School, San Francisco, US 1942–57
 City of London School, UK
 Covington Latin School, Kentucky, US
 Crystal Lake South High School, Illinois, US
 Chicago Law School at The University of Chicago, US
 Columbia Law School at Columbia University, US
 Cornell Law School at Cornell University, US
 Coalition of Latino and Latina Scholars at Teachers College, Columbia University, US
 Critical Language Scholarship Program of the US State Department

Societies and associations
 Caribbean Labour Solidarity, based in London, UK
 Chicago Linguistic Society
 Christian Legal Society
 Communist League of Struggle, US, 1931-1937

Software and technology
 Cable landing station, where a submarine cable comes ashore
 Common Language Specification, Microsoft
 CLS (command) to clear computer screen in several environments
 CLS (CONFIG.SYS directive), in DR-DOS
 Creative Lighting System, in Nikon speedlights

Medical and science
Computational Science, an academical research discipline
Canadian Light Source, a synchrotron light source
Clinical laboratory science, another name for Medical Technology or Medical Laboratory Science
Combat lifesaver, US non-medical military role

Music
 City of London Sinfonia
 CLS Music, a record label
Cali Life Style, a Hip Hop act

Transportation and vehicles
 Capsule launch system for space capsules
 Mercedes-Benz CLS-Class, automobile models

Business and finance
 CLS Group, a global financial market utility 
 Celestica, New York Stock Exchange symbol
 CLS Communication, translation services
 CLS Holdings, UK investment company 
 Core Labor Standards, ILO